is a Japanese light novel series written by Last Note, with illustrations by Akina. The novels are inspired by songs written by Last Note which use Vocaloids for the vocals. Media Factory published eight volumes of the novels from July 2013 to August 2016. A manga adaptation by Sayuki was serialized in Media Factory's Monthly Comic Gene magazine. An anime television series produced by Doga Kobo and directed by Tarō Iwasaki aired in Japan between April and June 2015.

Plot
Eruna Ichinomiya is a third-year middle school student who has not decided on which high school to attend, and spends her days skipping school and playing games at home. One day, Eruna's eyes are captivated by a photo of Seisa Mikagura in a pamphlet for Mikagura Private Academy, given to her by her cousin, Shigure Ninomiya. Feeling that it is fate, Eruna decides to attend Mikagura Private Academy. However, Eruna discovers that Mikagura Private Academy is a school where only cultural clubs exist, and that it has an intense battle system where students with special powers must fight each other as representatives of their own clubs.

Characters

Main characters
 

A somewhat dimwitted girl who has a romantic interest in girls and as a result spends much of her time playing dating simulation visual novels on her portable device. She enrolls into Mikagura Private Academy after her cousin Shigure recommends it to her, largely due to wanting to be able to meet Seisa whom she developed a strong interest in. She later form her own club, which she eventually names the "After School Paradise Club". Eruna is a descendant of the original Ichinomiya who along with Mikagura and Ninomiya founded the academy.

 

The granddaughter of Mikagura Academy's principal, who starts off as the sole member of the Going-Home Club but later joins Eruna's club. Seisa is a second-year at school, and is a hikikomori. She was once a member of the Art Club, but began secluding herself after she was betrayed by an upperclassman from the Photography Club. Seisa is a descendant of the original Mikagura.

 

Like Eruna, Otone is a first-year student who eventually becomes a member of Eruna's club. She puts up a cold front towards others, but is often secretly lonely and bad at opening up to people, often living in a small house in the woods.

 

Representative of the Calligraphy Club, Himi is a very small second-year, and has the appearance of a young child. She is extremely innocent, positive, and always has a smile on her face. Occasionally, she is the victims of Eruna's "delusions".

 

Eruna's cousin, a third-year who is the representative of the Manga Research Club. He is very attached to Eruna, and tries all sorts of ways to get closer to her, but he has not succeeded even once, and it seems that she is only avoiding him more and more. Shigure is a descendant of the original Ninomiya. Shigure kept knowledge of Eruna's ancestor a secret because he wants Eruna to make friends with Seisa naturally.

 

Yūto is a second-year who is the representative of the Drama Club. He is always smiling, and he is adored by the Drama Club members, who are known for being like a large family. He is always carrying a scythe, which is actually just a prop.

 

Kyōma is a third-year who is representative of the Art Club. His blunt attitude has caused most to fear him, but he can also be kind and is good at taking care of others; he also loves to drink milk. Both his face and uniform are always covered in paint.

 

Sadamatsu is a second-year who is both the leader and representative of the Flower Arrangement Club. He also seems to be spaced out, and shows no interest in anything.

 

Asuhi is a first-year who is part of the Astronomy Club. He came directly from Mikagura Academy's junior high school, and it is said that he may become the next representative. He has a very cute appearance which often causes him to be mistaken for a girl.

 

He was originally human and can transform between the two using a somewhat terrifying method, becoming a ghost member of Eruna's club. Since his real name appears to be unpronounceable in human language, Eruna nicknames him "Bimii" after the word .

Other characters
 

A third-year student who belongs to the Drama Club. She gave all the Drama Club members (except Yūto) animal-inspired names.

 

A freshman and member of the Drama Club. Often seen together with Tonkyun. He currently has not awoken his ability.

 

A freshman and member of the Drama Club who is often seen together with Usamaru. He uses a hammer as his item, which transforms into two swords used in dual wielding. He is interrupted every time he tries to say his real name.

 

A second-year student and member of the Drama Club who, like Himi, is very short.

Representative of the Newspaper Club.

 

Eruna's teacher and Seisa's maid. Her serious and deadpan demeanor does not hide her dislike for Eruna's antics, but she can be soft to Seisa.

 

A freshman member of the Calligraphy Club. She is a shy girl and the first female friend Eruna made on the academy.

The ace of the Brass Club.

Representative of the Broadcast Club.

Media

Print
Mikagura School Suite is a light novel series written by Last Note, with illustrations by Akina. Media Factory published eight volumes from July 25, 2013 to August 25, 2016.

A manga adaptation by Sayuki was serialized in Media Factory's Monthly Comic Gene magazine between the August 2013 and March 2016 issues. Media Factory published six tankōbon volumes from November 27, 2013 to March 26, 2016. One Peace Books will publish both the light novels and manga in English.

Anime
An anime television series adaptation, produced by Doga Kobo and directed by Tarō Iwasaki aired in Japan between April 7 and June 22, 2015. The series is written by Masahiro Yokotani and music is by Yoshiaki Fujisawa. Chief animation director Manamu Amazaki also designed the characters. The series is licensed in North America by Funimation, who simulcast the subtitled version as it aired and began streaming a broadcast dub version from June 9, 2015.

Episode list

References

External links
 
Anime official website 

2013 Japanese novels
Anime and manga based on light novels
Doga Kobo
Funimation
Japanese LGBT-related animated television series
Kadokawa Dwango franchises
Light novels
Media Factory manga
MF Bunko J
Shōjo manga
Television shows based on light novels